Helena Township may refer to:
 Helena Township, Michigan
 Helena Township, Scott County, Minnesota
 Helena Township, Griggs County, North Dakota, in Griggs County, North Dakota

Township name disambiguation pages